The Sarcoscyphaceae are a family of cup fungi in the order Pezizales.  Members of the Sarcoscyphaceae are cosmopolitan in distribution, found in both tropical and temperate regions.

Genera
A 2008 estimate placed 13 genera and 102 species in the family:
 Aurophora Rifai 1968
 Cookeina Kuntze 1891
 Geodina Denison 1965
 Kompsoscypha Pfister 1989
 Microstoma (fungus) Bernstein 1852
 Nanoscypha Denison 1972
 Phillipsia Berk. 1881
 Pithya Fuckel 1870
 Pseudopithyella Seaver 1928
 Sarcoscypha  (Fr.) Boud. 1885: anamorphs are Molliardiomyces Paden 1984
 Thindia Korf & Waraitch 1971
 Wynnea Berk. & M.A. Curtis 1867

References

 
Ascomycota families